Bonera is an Italian surname. Notable people with the surname include:

Daniele Bonera (born 1981), Italian footballer and coach
Franco Bonera (born 1945), Italian motorcycle racer

See also
Gonera

Italian-language surnames